Scorned: Love Kills is an American documentary television series on Investigation Discovery that features tales of love gone fatally wrong. The series premiered on January 21, 2012; it was renewed for a second season, third season, and fourth season.
In the UK, the show is titled Scorned: Crimes of Passion.

Maryland based singer Niki Barr provides the vocals for the theme song.

Episodes

Season 1 (2012)

Season 2 (2013)

Season 3 (2014)

Season 4 (2014)

Season 5 (2015)

Season 6 (2016)

References

2010s American documentary television series
2012 American television series debuts
English-language television shows
Investigation Discovery original programming
True crime television series
2016 American television series endings